Thomas Tomlinson (1887–unknown) was an English footballer who played in the Football League for Bradford (Park Avenue), Chesterfield Town and Notts County.

References

1887 births
English footballers
Association football forwards
English Football League players
Chesterfield F.C. players
Worksop Town F.C. players
Bradford (Park Avenue) A.F.C. players
Mexborough Town F.C. players
Notts County F.C. players
Newport County A.F.C. players
Year of death missing